Stevens as an English-language surname was brought to England after the Norman Conquest and means 'son of Steven'. This surname may refer to:

Arts and entertainment

Literature
Barry Stevens (therapist) (1902–1985), writer, Gestalt therapist
Benjamin Franklin Stevens (1833–1902), U.S. bibliographer
Emily Pitts Stevens (1841–1906), American educator, activist, suffragist, newspaper editor and publisher
Helen Norton Stevens (1869 - 1943), U.S. magazine editor
Henry Stevens (bibliographer) (1819–1886), U.S. bibliographer
K. J. Stevens (born 1973), U.S. writer
Nell Stevens (born 1985), British fiction and non-fiction writer
Robin Stevens (born 1988), English writer
Shane Stevens (author) (born 1941), U.S. crime writer
Wallace Stevens (1879–1955), U.S. poet

Visual arts
Alfred Stevens (sculptor) (1817–1875), British sculptor
Alfred Stevens (painter) (1823–1906), Belgian painter
Elsie Stevens (born 1907), British artist
Henry Isaac Stevens (1806–1873), English architect
John Calvin Stevens (1855–1940), American architect
Noreen Stevens (born 1962), Canadian cartoonist

Music
Cat Stevens (born 1948), British musician
Connie Stevens (born 1938), U.S. singer and actress
Denis Stevens (1922-2004), British musicologist
Earl Tywone Stevens Sr. (born 1967), American rapper who records under the name "E-40"
Herbert Stevens IV (born 1987), American hip-hop recording artist who records under the name "Ab-Soul"
John Stevens (drummer) (1940–1994), British drummer in Spontaneous Music Ensemble
John Stevens (singer) (born 1987), U.S. singer and American Idol contestant
Leigh Howard Stevens (born 1953), marimba artist
Matthew Stevens (born 1982) Canadian jazz guitarist and composer
Mike Stevens, Canadian harmonica player
R. J. S. Stevens (Richard John Samuel) (1757–1837), English composer and organist
Rachel Stevens (born 1978), British singer and actress
Ray Stevens (born 1939), U.S. country music singer and songwriter
Risë Stevens (1913–2013), American mezzo-soprano
Rogers Stevens (born 1970), pop guitarist
Roy Stevens (1916–1989), co-author of Stevens-Costello Triple C Embouchure Technique (1971)
Shakin' Stevens (born 1948), Welsh rock and roll singer
Steve Stevens (born 1959), U.S. rock guitarist
Sufjan Stevens (born 1975), U.S. musician and songwriter

Performing arts
Amber Stevens (born 1986), American actress
Andrew Stevens (born 1955), American actor and film producer
Angela Stevens (1925–2016), American actress
Ashton Stevens (1872–1951), American drama critic
Brody Stevens (1970–2019), American comedian and actor
Carrie Stevens (born 1969), American model and actress
Craig Stevens (actor) (1918–2000), American actor
D Stevens, American broadcast journalist, photojournalist, photographer and filmmaker
Fisher Stevens (born 1963), American actor
George Stevens (1904–1975), American film director
Inger Stevens (1934–1970), American actress
K. T. Stevens (1919–1994), American actress
 Landers Stevens (1877–1940), American actor
Leslie Stevens (1924–1998), American television writer 
Louis Stevens (1896–1963), American screenwriter
Michael Fenton Stevens (born 1958), British actor and comedian
Monica Stevens (dancer), Australian dancer with the Aboriginal Islander Dance Theatre in the 1980s
Morgan Stevens (1951-2022), American actor
Onslow Stevens (1902–1977), American actor
Robert Stevens (director) (1920–1989), American film director
 Ruth Stevens (1903–1989), Swedish actress
Shadoe Stevens (born 1947), American radio host, voice actor, and television personality
Stella Stevens (1938-2023), American actress

Religion
Abel Stevens (1815–1897), American editor, author and Methodist minister
Thomas Stevens (bishop), first Bishop of Barking

Sports
Amin Stevens (born 1990), American professional basketball player for Elitzur Kiryat Ata in Israel
Aron Stevens (born 1982), a ring name of American professional wrestler Aron Haddad
Asa Stevens (born 2000), American boxer
Brad Stevens (born 1976), American basketball coach
Chase Stevens (born 1979), American professional wrestler
Curtis Stevens (born 1985), American boxer
Dennis Stevens (1933–2012), English footballer for Bolton Wanderers, Everton, Oldham Athletic and Tranmere Rovers
Félix Stevens (born 1964), Cuban sprinter 
Gary Stevens (footballer, born 1954), English footballer
Gary Stevens (rugby league) (fl. 2013), Australian rugby league player
Gary A. Stevens (born 1962), another English footballer
Gary Stevens (jockey) (born 1963), American jockey
Gary M. Stevens (born 1963), the best known of several English footballers with this name
Gina Stevens, retired Australian basketball player
Greer Stevens (born 1957), South African tennis player
Greville Stevens (1901–1970), English cricketer
Huub Stevens (born 1953), Dutch footballer and coach
JaCoby Stevens (born 1998), American football player
John Cox Stevens (1785–1857), American yacht sailor
Kevin Stevens (born 1965), American ice hockey player
Kia Stevens (born 1977), American women's professional wrestler
Kirk Stevens (born 1958), Canadian professional snooker player
Lamar Stevens (born 1997), American basketball player
Matthew Stevens (born 1977), Welsh professional snooker player
Monica Stevens (born 1967), Antigua and Barbuda sprinter
Patrick Stevens (born 1968), Belgian sprinter
Paul Stevens (baseball) (born 1953), American college baseball coach
R. C. Stevens (born 1934), Major League Baseball first baseman
Ray Stevens (wrestler) (1935–1996), American professional wrestler
Raymond Stevens (judoka) (born 1963), English judoka
Robyn Stevens (born 1983), American race walker
Scott Stevens (born 1964), Canadian ice hockey player
Thomas Stevens (cyclist) (1854–1935), British cyclist, the first person to circle the globe by bicycle
Tommy Stevens (born 1996), American football player

Science and technology
Alexander Hodgdon Stevens (1789–1869), U.S. physician
Austin Stevens (born 1950), South African herpetologist and documentary film maker
Brooks Stevens (1911–1995), U.S. car designer
Carly Stevens UK academic ecologist and soil geochemist
Frank Lincoln Stevens (1871–1934), American mycologist and phytopathologist
Frederick William Stevens (1847-1900), English architectural engineer who worked for the British colonial government in India
Frederick W. Stevens (physicist) (1861–1932), American physicist who did research on gaseous explosive reactions
George Phillip Stevens (1861-1941), Australian wireless experimenter and public servant
John Stevens (inventor, born 1749) (1749–1838), U.S. inventor, recipient of the first American railroad charter
John Frank Stevens (1853–1943), U.S. engineer (Great Northern Railway, Panama Canal)
Malcolm Stevens (born 1938), English chemist and FRS
Neil Everett Stevens (1887–1949), U.S. mycologist and plant pathologist
Nettie Stevens (1861–1912), U.S. biologist and geneticist
Perdita Stevens (born 1966), British mathematician and computer scientist
Peter Stevens (car designer) (born 1945), British car designer
Stanley Smith Stevens (1906–1973), U.S. psychologist
W. Richard Stevens (1951–1999), author of UNIX and TCP/IP books

Academia
Albert K. Stevens (1901–1984), U.S. professor and activist
Rosemary A. Stevens, American medical historian

Business
Edwin A. Stevens (1795–1868), U.S. philanthropist and entrepreneur
Edwin Augustus Stevens Jr. (1858–1918), marine engineer and business co-founder
John Austin Stevens (1795–1874), American banker
Kenneth H. Stevens (1922-2005), executive of the Scouts Association
Richard Stevens (1868–1919), French-born attorney and U.S. real estate developer 
Robert L. Stevens (1787–1856), U.S. railroad executive
Simon Stevens (1974-), Disability Consultant

Politics

Australia
Bertram Stevens (1889–1973), 25th Premier of New South Wales
Ernest James Stevens (1845–1922), Member of the Queensland Legislative Assembly and of the Queensland Legislative Council
Henry Stevens (Australian politician) (1854–1935), Member of the Queensland Legislative Assembly
James Stevens (Australian politician) (born 1983), Member of the Australian House of Representatives
Ray Stevens (politician) (born 1953), Member of the Queensland Legislative Assembly

Canada 
Henry Herbert Stevens (1878–1973), Canadian politician and businessman
Ron Stevens (born 1949), Canadian politician
Sinclair Stevens (1927–2016), Canadian politician

United States
 Ben Stevens (born 1959), U.S. politician, Alaska State Senator, son of Ted Stevens
 Durham Stevens (1851–1908), an American diplomat and later an employee of Japan's Ministry of Foreign Affairs
 Ephraim E. Stevens (1851–1907), American architect and politician in Wisconsin
 Frederick P. Stevens (1810–1866), mayor of Buffalo, New York
 Hestor L. Stevens (1803–1864), U.S. Representative from Michigan
 Isaac Stevens (1818–1862), first governor of Washington Territory, brigadier general in the Union Army
 J. Christopher Stevens (1960–2012), an American diplomat and lawyer killed during the 2012 Benghazi attack in Libya
 John Stevens (New Jersey politician) (c. 1716–1792), U.S. politician, delegate to the Continental Congress
 John L. Stevens (1820–1895), U.S. diplomat
 John Paul Stevens (1920–2019), U.S. Supreme Court justice
 Richard Y. Stevens, U.S. politician (North Carolina)
 Robert T. Stevens (1899–1983), U.S. businessman and politician
 Stephen Stevens (1793-1870) Justice of the Indiana Supreme Court, abolitionist
 Ted Stevens (1923–2010), U.S. politician, U.S. Senator from Alaska
 Thaddeus Stevens (1792–1868) US Congressman from Pennsylvania, a leader of the Radical Republicans and a fierce opponent of slavery

Other countries
Jimmy Stevens (politician) (1910s or 1920s–1994), Ni-Vanuatu politician
Jo Stevens (born 1966), Labour Party politician in the United Kingdom, Member of Parliament (MP) for Cardiff Central since 2015
John Stevens, Baron Stevens of Kirkwhelpington, (born 1942), former Commissioner of the Metropolitan Police, London
Siaka Stevens (1905–1988), former President of Sierra Leone

Military
Ebenezer Stevens (1751–1823), American Revolutionary War figure and New York merchant
Jack Stevens (1896–1969), Australian general
Thomas Holdup Stevens (1795–1841), American naval admiral in the War of 1812
Thomas H. Stevens, Jr. (1819–1896), American naval admiral

History
Alzina Stevens (1849-1900), American labor leader, journalist
John Stevens (immigrant) (1682–1737), immigrant to British America, Port Collector at Perth Amboy, New Jersey
John Austin Stevens (1827–1910), U.S. historian and businessman
John H. Stevens (1820–1900), considered to be the first settler in the city of Minneapolis, Minnesota
Robert Stevens (photo editor) (1938-2001), U.S. photo editor, 2001 anthrax attacks victim
Thaddeus Stevens (1792–1868), U.S. lawyer famous for defending runaway slaves

Miscellaneous
Albert Stevens (disambiguation)
Gary Stevens (disambiguation)
Joseph Stevens (disambiguation)
Paul Stevens (disambiguation)

Fictional characters
The Stevens family, in Even Stevens, U.S. comedy television program
Stevens, the Pirates' star player, Galactik Football
Mr. Stevens, the butler in Kazuo Ishiguro's 1989 novel The Remains of the Day
Bebe Stevens, from TV series South Park
Chris Stevens (Northern Exposure)
Erik Stevens, a character from Black Panther (film)
Izzie Stevens, Grey's Anatomy
Niki Stevens, a character on The L Word
Serena Stevens, a fictional character in the television series Law & Order: Criminal Intent

See also

Surnames of British Isles origin
English-language surnames
Surnames of Belgian origin
Dutch-language surnames
Patronymic surnames
Surnames from given names